Algemene Televisie Verzorging (ATV) is a television station in Suriname. It was founded in 1983, and was the second television station in Suriname. It is operated by the state's Telecommunication Company Telesur. In August 2014, ATV made work of it to switch from analog to digital TV. The network uses the ATSC standard. ATV's picture formats are 480p (SDTV) 720p (HDTV).

Programming

ATV programs
 ATV Nieuws
 ATV Sport
 Whazzz Up?
 The Ellen DeGeneres Show
 Panorama
 Teen Magazine
 Sarnami TV
 Damkha TV
 Super Hit Video
 Super Hit Classics 
 Glory 17
 The haves and have nots
 Worst Case Scenario with Bear Grylls
 Info Act
 BBC News
 CNN News
 Suri Tunes
 Steven Reyme Ministries
 Fitness 
 G.I.Joe Sigma
 Documentaries
 The Rubing Health Foundation
 ATV WK Journaal (Alleen tijdens WK)
 Luku Dosu
 1 voor 12
 Trekking: Tek.2/Double Tek.2/Match.3/High.5
 Devious Maids
 In Gesprek Met (Speaking With)
 The New Games Plus
 Logos International
 Project Runway All Stars
 The Amazing Race
 School TV
 The Chronicles Of Riddick
 Bribi Ministries 
 Soeng Ngie’s Keukengeheimen
 Gods Rivier Ministries
 Kinderfilms
 X-Games Hot Wheels Double Dare 
 Fish Finder
 Top Gear
 Maranatha Ministries 
 Wonderen vandaag (Miracles Today)
 Kimmy’s Land
 Everybody Hates Chris
 Saving Hope
 Youth Outreach
 Player Attack
 Tv.films
 Owru Pokuman Fu Sranan
 Tekenfilms
 De Levende Steen Gemeente (The Living Stone Community)
 KidzTori
 Revue : Binnenlands Weekoverzicht (National Week in Review)
 Voedselveiligheid En Voedingsziekten (Food Safety and Food-borne Illness)

TV2 programs
 Tempo Networks
 ATV Nieuws
 ATV Sport
 Panorama
 Suri Tunes
 Info Act
 BBC News
 CNN News
 Teletubbies 
 1 en 1 = 3
 Hell's Kitchen
 Kuku Tori
 NBA Action

External links
ATV website
TV2 website

Television stations in Suriname
1983 establishments in Suriname
Companies of Suriname